El Bochinche is a Venezuelan town on the border with Guyana in the Sifontes Municipality, state of Bolivar. Most of the population of El Bochinche is Amerindian.

Guyana–Venezuela border crossings